Echinopsis hammerschmidii,  is a species of Echinopsis found in Bolivia.

References

External links
 
 

hammerschmidii